The  were a semi-professional baseball team in the Shikoku-Kyūshū Island League of Japan that played out of Nagasaki Prefecture. The team was established as part of an expansion of the league in 2008 (along with the Fukuoka Red Warblers).

In 2009 the team won a half-season championship. Following the 2010 season, the team announced that it would not be participating in the league's 2011 season; the Saints were officially dissolved in September 2010.

References

External links
Official web site (in Japanese) 
IBLJ page
IBLJ press release
Nagasaki Shimbun article
Mainichi Shimbun article
Yomiuri Shimbun article

Baseball teams in Japan
Baseball teams established in 2008
Sports teams in Nagasaki Prefecture